Pupillary response is a physiological response that varies the size of the pupil, via the optic and oculomotor cranial nerve.

A constriction response (miosis), is the narrowing of the pupil, which may be caused by scleral buckles or drugs such as opiates/opioids or anti-hypertension medications. Constriction of the pupil occurs when the circular muscle, controlled by the parasympathetic nervous system (PSNS), contracts, and also to an extent when the radial muscle relaxes.

A dilation response (mydriasis), is the widening of the pupil and may be caused by adrenaline; anticholinergic agents; stimulant drugs such as MDMA, cocaine, and amphetamines; and some hallucinogenics (e.g. LSD). Dilation of the pupil occurs when the smooth cells of the radial muscle, controlled by the sympathetic nervous system (SNS), contract, and also when the cells of the iris sphincter muscle relax.

The responses can have a variety of causes, from an involuntary reflex reaction to exposure or inexposure to light—in low light conditions a dilated pupil lets more light into the eye—or it may indicate interest in the subject of attention or arousal, sexual stimulation, uncertainty, decision conflict, errors, physical activity or increasing cognitive load or demand. The responses correlate strongly with activity in the locus coeruleus neurotransmitter system. The pupils contract immediately before REM sleep begins. A pupillary response can be intentionally conditioned as a Pavlovian response to some stimuli.

The latency of pupillary response (the time in which it takes to occur) increases with age.

In ophthalmology, intensive studies of pupillary response are conducted via videopupillometry.

Anisocoria is the condition of one pupil being more dilated than the other.

See also 
Cycloplegia
Dilated fundus examination
Iris sphincter muscle
Pupillary light reflex
Pupillary reflex
Pupillometry
Pupilometer

References 

Sexual arousal
Pupil